Eastern Slavic naming customs are the traditional way of identifying a person's given name and patronymic name in Russia and some countries formerly part of the Russian Empire or the Soviet Union.

They are used commonly in Russia, Belarus, Ukraine, Kazakhstan, Turkmenistan, Uzbekistan, and to a lesser extent in Kyrgyzstan, Tajikistan, Azerbaijan, Armenia, and Georgia. It is named after the East Slavic languages group that the Belarusian, Russian, Rusyn and Ukrainian languages belong to.

Given names
Eastern Slavic parents select a given name for a newborn child. Most first names in East Slavic languages originate from two sources:

 Eastern Orthodox Church tradition 
 native pre-Christian Slavic lexicons

Almost all first names are single. Doubled first names (as in, for example, French, like Jean-Luc) are very rare and are from foreign influence. Most doubled first names are written with a hyphen: Mariya-Tereza.

Males

Females

Forms
Being highly synthetic languages, Eastern Slavic treats personal names as grammatical nouns and apply the same rules of inflection and derivation to them as for other nouns. So one can create many forms with different degrees of affection and familiarity by adding the corresponding suffixes to the auxiliary stem derived from the original name. The auxiliary stem may be identical to the word stem of the full name (the full name Жанна Zhanna can have the suffixes added directly to the stem Жанн- Zhann- like Жанночка Zhannochka), and most names have the auxiliary stem derived unproductively (the Russian name Михаил Mikhail has the auxiliary stem Миш- Mish-, which produces such name-forms as Миша Misha, Мишенька Mishenka, Мишуня Mishunya etc., not *Михаилушка Mikhailushka).

Unlike English, in which the use of diminutive forms is optional even between close friends, in East Slavonic languages, such forms are obligatory in certain contexts because of the strong T–V distinction: the T-form of address usually requires the short form of the counterpart's name. Also, unlike other languages with prominent use of name suffixes, such as Japanese, the use of derived name forms is mostly limited to the T-addressing: there is no way to make the name more formal than the plain unsuffixed full form, and no suffixes can be added to the family name.

Most commonly, Russian philologists distinguish the following forms of given names:

Short forms

The "short name" (Russian: краткое имя kratkoye imya), historically also "half-name" (Russian: полуимя poluimya), is the simplest and most common name derivative. Bearing no suffix, it is produced suppletively and always has the declension noun ending for both males and females, thus making short forms of certain unisex names indistinguishable: for example, Sasha (Russian: Саша) is the short name for both the masculine name Aleksandr (Alexander) and the feminine form Aleksandra (Alexandra).

Some names, such as Zhanna (Jeana) and Mark, have no short forms; others may have two (or more) different forms. In the latter case, one form is usually more informal than the other.

Diminutive forms

Diminutive forms are produced from the "short name" by means of various suffixes; for example, Михаил Mikhail (full) – Миша Misha (short) – Мишенька Mishenka (affectionate) – Мишка Mishka (colloquial). If no "short name" exists, then diminutive forms are produced from the full form of the respective first name; for example, Марина Marina (full) – Мариночка Marinochka (affectionate) – Маринка Marinka (colloquial). Unlike the full name, a diminutive name carries a particular emotional attitude and may be unacceptable in certain contexts. Depending on the nature of the attitude, diminutive name forms can be subdivided into three broad groups: affectionate, familiar, and slang.

Affectionate diminutive
Typically formed by suffixes -еньк- (-yenk-), -оньк- (-onk-), -ечк- (-yechk-), -ушк (-ushk), as illustrated by the examples below. It generally emphasises a tender, affectionate attitude and is roughly analogous to German suffixes -chen, -lein, Japanese -chan and -tan and affectionate name-derived nicknames in other languages. It is often used to address children or intimate friends.

Within a more official context, this form may be combined with the honorific plural to address a younger female colleague.

Colloquial diminutives

Colloquial diminutives are derived from short names by the -к- ("-k-") suffix. Expressing a highly familiar attitude, the use may be considered rude or even pejorative outside a friendly context.

Slang forms

Slang forms exist for male names and, since a few decades ago, female names. They are formed with the suffixes -ян (-yan), -он (-on), and -ок/ёк (-ok/yok). The suffixes give the sense of "male brotherhood" that was once expressed by the patronymic-only form of address in the Soviet Union. Originating in criminal communities, such forms came into wide usage in Russia in the 1990s.

Early Soviet Union

During the days of the October Revolution, as part of the campaign to rid Russia of bourgeois culture, there was a drive to invent new, revolutionary names. As a result, many Soviet children were given atypical names, often being acronyms/initialisms besides many other names above.

Patronymics
The patronymic name is based on the first name of the father and is written in all legal and identity documents. If used with the first name, the patronymic always follows it.

Usage
The patronymic name is obligatory when addressing a person of higher social stance and/or on special occasions such as business meetings; for example, when a pupil addresses a teacher, they are obliged to use both first and patronymic names – . Not using patronymic names in such situations is considered offensive.

Addressing a person by patronymic name only is widespread among older generations (more often – "blue collar"-male coworkers) and serves as a display of close relationship based on not only sympathy but also mutual responsibility.

Derivation

The patronymic is formed by a combination of the father's name and suffixes. The suffix is -ович  for a son, -овна  – for a daughter. For example, if the father's name was Иван (Ivan), the patronymic will be Иванович (Ivanovich) for a son and Ивановна (Ivanovna) for a daughter.

If the suffix is being appended to a name ending in a й ("y") or a soft consonant, the initial o in the suffixes -ович  and -овна  becomes a е ("ye") and the suffixes change to -евич  and -евна . For example, if the father is Дмитрий (Dmitry), the patronymic is Дмитриевич (Dmitrievich) for a son and Дмитриевна (Dmitrievna) for a daughter. It is not Дмитрович (Dmitrovich) or Дмитровна (Dmitrovna) because the name Дмитрий (Dmitry) ends on "й" ("y");

For some names ending in a vowel, the suffix is -ич  for a son and -ична  or -инична  for a daughter; for example, Фока Foka (father's first name) – Фокич Fokich (male patronymic) – Фокична Fokichna (female patronymic); Кузьма Kuzma (father's first name) – Кузьмич Kuzmich (male patronymic) – Кузьминична Kuzminichna (female patronymic).

Historical grounds 

Historical Russian naming conventions did not include surnames. A person's name included that of his father: e.g. Иван Петров сын (Ivan Petrov syn) which means "Ivan, son of Peter". That is the origin of most Russian -ov surnames.

Modern -ovich- patronyms were originally a feature of the royal dynasty (Рюриковичи, Ruerikovichi, Rurikids, which makes the East Slavic patronym in its original meaning being similar to German von. From the 17th century, the second name with suffix -ович (-ovich) was the privilege given by the tsar to commoners. For example, in 1610, Tsar Vasili IV gave to the Stroganovs, who were merchants, the privilege to use patronyms. As a tribute for developing the salt industry in Siberia, Pyotr Stroganov and all his issues were allowed to have a name with -ovich. The tsar wrote in the chart dated on 29 May, "... to write him with ovich, to try [him] in Moscow only, not to fee [him] by other fees, not to kiss a cross by himself [which means not to swear during any processions]" In the 18th century, it was the family of merchants to have patronyms. By the 19th century, the -ovich form eventually became the default form of a patronymic.

Legal basis
Everyone in Russia, Ukraine, and Belarus is supposed to have a tripartite name. Single mothers may give their children any patronym, and this does not have any legal consequences. Foreigners who adopt Russian citizenship are exempted from having a patronym. Now, an adult person is entitled to change patronyms if necessary, such as to alienate themselves from the biological father (or to show respect for the adopted one) as well as to decide the same for an underage child.

Family names
Family names are generally used like in English.

Derivation and meaning

In Russian, some common suffixes are -ов (-ov), -ев (-yev), meaning "belonging to" or "of the clan of/descendant of", e.g. Petrov = of the clan of/descendant of Petr (Peter), usually used for patronymic surnames—or -ский (-sky), an adjectival form, meaning "associated with" and usually used for toponymic surnames. Historically, toponymic surnames may have been granted as a token of nobility; for example, the princely surname Shuysky is indicative of the princedom based on the ownership of Shuya. Prince Grigory Aleksandrovich Potemkin-Tavricheski had the victory title 'Tavricheski', as part of his surname, granted to him for the annexation of Crimea by the Russian Empire.

In the 19th and early 20th centuries, -off was a common transliteration of -ov for Russian family names in foreign languages such as French and German (like for the Smirnoff and the Davidoff brands).

Surnames of Ukrainian and Belarusian origin use the suffixes -ко (-ko), -ук (-uk), and -ич (-ych). For example, the family name Писаренко (Pisarenko) is derived from the word for a scribe, and Ковальчук (Kovalchuk) refers to a smith.

Less often, some versions of family names will have no suffix, e.g. Lebed, meaning swan, and Zhuk, meaning beetle (but see also Lebedev and Zhukov).

Hyphenated surnames like Petrov-Vodkin are possible.

Grammar

Eastern Slavic languages are synthetic languages and have grammatical cases and grammatical gender. Unlike analytic languages like English, which use prepositions ("to", "at", "on" etc.) to show the links and relations between words in a sentence, Eastern Slavic suffixes are used much more broadly than prepositions. Words need the help of some suffix to integrate them into the sentence and to build a grammatically correct sentence. That includes names, unlike in German. Family names are declined based on the Slavic case system.

The surnames that originally are short (-ov, -ev, -in) or full (-iy/-oy/-yy) Slavic adjectives, have different forms depending on gender: male forms -ov, -ev, -in and -iy/-oy/-yy correspond to female forms -ova, -eva, -ina and -aya, respectively. For example, the wife of Борис Ельцин (Boris Yel'tsin) was Наина Ельцина (Naina Yel'tsina); the wife of Leo Tolstoy was Sophia Tolstaya, etc. All other, i.e. non-adjectival, surnames stay the same for both genders (including surnames ending with -енко (-yenko), -ич (-ich) etc.), unlike in many West Slavic languages, where the non-adjectival surname of men corresponds to derivative feminine adjectival surname (Novák → Nováková). Note the difference between patronymics and surnames ending with -ich: surnames are the same for males and females, but patronymics are gender-dependent (for example, Ivan Petrovich Mirovich and Anna Petrovna Mirovich)

This dependence of grammatical gender of adjectival surname on the gender of its owner is not considered to be changing the surname (compare the equivalent rule in Polish, for example). The correct transliteration of such feminine surnames in English is debated: the names technically should be in their original form, but they sometimes appear in the masculine form.

The example of Иванов (Ivanov), a family name, will be used:

The surnames which are not grammatically adjectives (Zhuk, Gogol, Barchuk, Kupala etc.) declines in cases and numbers as the corresponding common noun. The exclusion is when a woman has a surname which is grammatically a noun of masculine gender; in such case, the surname is not declined. For example, Ivan and Anna Zhuk in dative case ("to whom?") would be: Ивану Жуку (Ivanu Zhuku), but Анне Жук (Anne Zhuk).

Family names are generally inherited from one's parents. As in English, on marriage, women usually adopt the surname of the husband; the opposite, when the husband adopt the maiden surname of his wife, very rarely occurs. Rarely, both spouses keep their pre-marriage family names. The fourth, very rare but still legal way is the taking a double surname; for example, in marriage of Ivanov (he) and Petrovskaya (she), the spouses may adopt the family name Ivanov-Petrovsky and Ivanova-Petrovskaya, correspondingly.

Slavicisation of foreign names

Slavicisation of foreign surnames

Some surnames in those languages have been russified since the 19th century: the surname of Kazakh president Nursultan Nazarbayev has a Russian "-yev" suffix, which literally means "of Nazar-bay" (in which "bay" is a Turkic native noble rank: compare Turkish "bey", Uzbek "beg", and Kyrghyz "bek"). The frequency of such russification varies greatly by country.

After incorporation of Azerbaijan into the Soviet Union, it became obligatory to register their surnames and to add a Russian suffix such as -yev or -ov for men and -yeva or -ova for women. Since the majority did not have official surnames, the problem was resolved by adopting the name of the father and adding the mentioned suffixes. Examples are Aliyev, Huseynov, and Mammadov.

Since 1930s and 1940s, surnames and patronymics were obligatory in Uzbekistan. The surname could be derived from the name of the father by adding the suffixes -ev after  vowels or soft consonants and -ov in all other cases. Examples are Rashidov and Abdullaev. Most of the people born in this time had the same surname as their patronymic.

Slavicisation of foreign patronymics
By law, foreign persons who adopt Russian citizenship are allowed to have no patronymic. Some adopt non-Slavonic patronymics as well. For example, the Russian politician Irina Hakamada's patronym is Муцуовна (Mutsuovna) because her Japanese father's given name was Mutsuo. The ethnicity of origin generally remains recognizable in Russified names. Other examples are Kazakh ұлы (uly; transcribed into Latin script as -uly, as in Nursultan Abishuly Nazarbayev), Turkmen uly (as in Gurbanguly Berdimuhamedow), or Azeri оглы/оғлу (oglu) (as in Heydar Alirza oglu Aliyev); Kazakh қызы (transcribed into Latin script as -qyzy, as in Dariga Nursultanqyzy Nazarbayeva). Such Turkic patronymics were officially allowed in the Soviet Union.

Bruno Pontecorvo, after he emigrated to the Soviet Union, was known as Бруно Максимович Понтекорво (Bruno Maximovich Pontekorvo) in the Russian scientific community, as his father's given name was Massimo (corresponding to Russian Максим (Maksim)). His sons have been known by names Джиль Брунович Понтекорво (Gigl Brunovich Pontecorvo), Антонио Брунович Понтекорво (Antonio Brunovich Pontecorvo) and Тито Брунович Понтекорво (Tito Brunovich Pontekorvo).

Anglicisation of slavic names
When names are written in English, the patronymic is not equivalent to an English middle name.  When the name is written in English, the patronymic may be omitted with the given name written out in full or abbreviated (Vladimir Putin or V. Putin), both the first name and the patronymic may be written out in full (Vladimir Vladimirovich Putin), both the first name and the patronymic may be abbreviated (V. V. Putin) or the first name may be written out in full with the patronymic abbreviated (Vladimir V. Putin).

Forms of address

Common rules
For informal communication, only the first name is used: Иван Ivan. Even more informally, diminutives (several can be formed from one name) are often used. 
In rural areas, the patronymic name alone (Петрович Petrovich, Ивановна Ivanovna) is used by old people among themselves, but young people sometimes use the form for irony. Also, younger people can use the form for much older people for both respect and informality. For example, a much younger man with a very good relationship with his elder colleague may use a patronymic and the "ty" form, but using the first name alone is generally inappropriate. Using a diminutive (like in most informal communication) would nearly always be very impolite.
The family name alone (Петров, Petrov) is used, much more rarely, in formal communications. It is commonly used by school teachers to address their students. Informally, Russians are starting to call people by their surnames alone for irony.
 the form "first name + patronymic" (for instance, Иван Иванович, Ivan Ivanovich):
 is the feature of official communication (for instance, students in schools and universities call their teachers in the form of "first name + patronymic" only);
 may convey the speaker's respect for the recipient. Historically, patronymics were reserved for the royal dynasty (Рюриковичи, Ruerikovichi)
 The full three-name form (for instance, Иван Иванович Петров Ivan Ivanovich Petrov) is used mostly for official documents. Everyone in Russia, Ukraine, and Belarus is supposed to have three names. This form is also used on some very formal occasions and for introducing oneself to a person who is likely to write down the full name, like a police officer. Then, the family name is often placed first (Петров Иван Иванович, Petrov Ivan Ivanovich).

The choice of addressing format is closely linked to the choice of second-person pronoun. Russian language distinguishes:

 formal вы (vy, "you"); respectful Вы ("Vy", "You") may be capitalized in formal correspondence, but plural вы ("vy", "you") is not.
 informal ты (ty, "you", "thou" in old English);

Вы ("Vy") is the plural of both forms to address a pair or group. Historically, it comes from German, under Peter the Great, which uses du and Sie similarly.

Other than the use of patronymics, Russian forms of address in Russian are very similar to English ones.

Also, the meaning of the form of address strongly depends on the choice of a V-T form:

Using a "ty" form with a person who dislikes it or on inappropriate occasions can be an insult, especially the surname alone.

Adjectives
Other Eastern Slavic languages use the same adjectives of their literal translation if they differ from Russian analogue. All Eastern Slavic languages are synthetic languages, and grammatical genders are used. Thus, the suffix of an adjective changes with the sex of the recipient.

In Russian, adjectives before names are generally restricted to written forms of communication. Adjectives like Любимый / Любимая (lyubimiy / lyubimaya, "beloved") and Милый / Милая (miliy / milaya, "sweetheart") are informal, and Уважаемый / Уважаемая (uvazhayemiy / uvazhayemaya, literally "respected") is highly formal. Some adjectives, like Дорогой / Дорогая (dorogoy / dorogaya, "dear"), can be used in both formal and informal letters.

See also
List of surnames in Russia
Onomastics
Romanization of Russian
Russian personal name
Slavic names
Slavic surnames
Ukrainian name

References

External links 
 In Russian
 
 Commentaries

Балановская Е. В., Соловьева Д. С., Балановский О. П. и др. «Фамильные портреты» пяти русских регионов / Медицинская генетика. 2005.No. 1. С. 2–10.

Таблицы и рисунки к статье «Фамильные портреты» пяти русских регионов

 In English

Russian Empire Soviet Union and CIS countries, Names in
 
Slavic-language names